Alwalkeria ("for Alick Walker") is a genus partly based on basal saurischian dinosaur remains from the Late Triassic, living in India. A thighbone found indicates a small bipedal form. It has been seen as a chimera.

Etymology
This taxon was originally named Walkeria maleriensis by Sankar Chatterjee in 1987, in honor of British paleontologist Alick Walker. However, since the original generic name was found to be preoccupied by a bryozoan, the name Alwalkeria was created in 1994 by Chatterjee and Ben Creisler. The specific name maleriensis is a reference to the Maleri Formation, in southern India, where its fossils were found.

Description

The only known specimen, holotype ISI R306 is incomplete and consists of parts of the front ends of the upper and lower jaws, 28 incomplete vertebrae from all parts of the spinal column, most of a femur, and an astragalus (ankle bone). The partial skull is about 4 centimeters long (1.5 in). Although material of Alwalkeria is limited, the spacing and shape of the teeth strongly resemble those of Eoraptor. As in Eoraptor, a gap separates the teeth of the premaxillary and the maxillary bones of the upper jaw. Other similarities in the skull of the two animals also link them on morphological grounds. Gregory S. Paul estimated its weight at 2 kg and length at 1.5 m in 2010.

Dentition and diet
The holotype had heterodont dentition in the upper jaw, meaning that the teeth are differently shaped depending on their position in the jaw. Similarly to Eoraptor and basal sauropodomorphs, the front teeth are slender and straight, while the teeth in the sides of the jaw are curved backwards like those of predatory theropods, although none of these teeth are serrated. This arrangement of teeth is neither clearly herbivorous nor clearly carnivorous, which suggests that the jaws were from an omnivore with a varied diet, including insects, small vertebrates, and plant material.

Status as a chimera
Rauhut and Remes (2005) found Alwalkeria to be a chimera, with the anterior skull referable to a crurotarsan, and the vertebrae referable to various other ancient reptiles including Prolacertiformes. The femur and the astragalus are clearly dinosaurian however, with the latter possessing saurischian characteristics.

Classification and phylogeny
Chatterjee 1987 originally described Alwalkeria as a basal theropod. In 1996, Loyal et al. agreed with this classification. Paul (1988) understood Alwalkeria as a link between herrerasaurids and the genus Protoavis, and hence assigned it to Herrerasauridae based on features of the femur. However Langer (2004) and Martínez and Alcober (2009), observed that Alwalkeria was too primitive to be a theropod and considered it a basal saurischian. The current scientific consensus is that this genus, or at least its hindlimb, does indeed occupy a basal position within Saurischia.
 
Alwalkeria has not been included in a cladistic analysis, but its similarities to Eoraptor suggest it may have held a similar position in the dinosaur family tree. However, the position of Eoraptor was formerly disputed, with one analysis finding it within the order Saurischia, but basal to the Theropoda-Sauropodomorpha split. Paul Sereno insisted that Eoraptor was a basal theropod.

Distinguishing anatomical features
A diagnosis is a statement of the anatomical features of an organism (or group) that collectively distinguish it from all other organisms. Some, but not all, of the features in a diagnosis are also autapomorphies. An autapomorphy is a distinctive anatomical feature that is unique to a given organism or group.

According to Chatterjee (1987) Alwalkeria can be distinguished based on the following characteristics:
 an excavation is present in the bases of the dorsal neural arches (debated because the vertebrae likely don't belong to Alwalkeria)
 the presence of a highly expanded femoral head
 the fourth trochanter is very prominent

Several features would make Alwalkeria unique among basal dinosaurs, such as its lack of serrated teeth, the mandibular symphysis being proportionally wider than almost any other known dinosaur, and there is a very large articulation between the fibula and the ankle.

Paleoecology

Provenance and occurrence
The only known specimen of Alwalkeria was recovered in the Godavari Valley locality from the Maleri Formation of Andhra Pradesh, India. The remains were collected by S. Chatterjee in 1974 in red mudstone that was deposited during the Carnian stage of the Triassic period, approximately 235 to 228 million years ago. The specimen is housed in the collection of the Indian Statistical Institute, in Kolkata, India.

Fauna and habitat
The Maleri Formation has been interpreted as being the site of an ancient lake or river. Material of the prosauropods Jaklapallisaurus and Nambalia have been found in the Maleri Formation, as well as intermediate prosauropod remains, and Alwalkeria is the only named carnivorous dinosaur species from this locality.

References

Bibliography 

 Remes, K. and Rauhut, O. W. M. 2005. The oldest Indian dinosaur Alwalkeria maleriensis Chatterjee revised: a chimera including remains of a basal saurischian; p. 218 in Kellner, A. W . A., Henriques, D .D. R. and Rodrigues, T. (eds.), II Congresso Latino-Americano de Paleontologie de Vertebrados. Boletim de Resumos. Museu Nacional, Rio de Janeiro.
 Chatterjee, S. & Creisler, B.S. 1994. Alwalkeria (Theropoda) and Morturneria (Plesiosauria), new names for preoccupied Walkeria Chatterjee, 1987, and Turneria Chatterjee and Small, 1989. Journal of Vertebrate Paleontology 14(1): 142.
 Norman, D.B. 1990. Problematic Theropods: Coelurosaurs. In: Weishampel, D.B., Dodson, P. & Osmolska, H. (Eds.). The Dinosauria (1st Edition). Berkeley: University of California Press. Pp. 280–305.

External links 
 Alwalkeria at Dinosaurier-Info (in German)

Prehistoric saurischians
Late Triassic dinosaurs of Asia
Carnian genera
Dinosaurs of India and Madagascar
Fossils of India
Fossil taxa described in 1994
Taxa named by Sankar Chatterjee